The Futsal Superleague of Kosovo is the top level of the Kosovar futsal league system. The Superleague is organized by the Football Federation of Kosovo and the division currently has a 9-team format.

Clubs (2020–21)

Note: Table lists in alphabetical order.

Kosovo futsal clubs in European competitions

External links
 

Futsal
Kosovo
Sports leagues established in 2005
Sports leagues established in 2008
2008 establishments in Kosovo